Lila Pérez-Rul (born 17 August 1977) is a Mexican rower. She competed in the women's lightweight double sculls event at the 2008 Summer Olympics.

References

1977 births
Living people
Mexican female rowers
Olympic rowers of Mexico
Rowers at the 2008 Summer Olympics
Sportspeople from Torreón
Pan American Games medalists in rowing
Pan American Games gold medalists for Mexico
Pan American Games silver medalists for Mexico
Rowers at the 2007 Pan American Games
Rowers at the 2011 Pan American Games
Medalists at the 2011 Pan American Games
20th-century Mexican women
21st-century Mexican women